Lütfiye can refer to:

 Lütfiye, İnegöl
 Lütfiye, Kestel
 Lütfiye (name), a given name